Girolamo Cattaneo  (active 1540–1584) was an Italian military writer who in his lifetime was regarded as one of the foremost masters of military architecture.

Life 

Cattaneo was born in Novara, northern Italy, but his background is otherwise unknown. It is posited that he must have had considerable training in mathematics and geometry, given his knowledge of hydraulics, surveying, and ballistics. He was a military architect and worked predominantly in Mantua and Brescia.
He worked for Vespasiano I Gonzaga, duke of Sabbioneta, whom he advised on the construction of a new fortification, in particular the two city gates ("Porta Vittoria" and "Porta Imperiale") and the defensive wall of Sabbioneta.

Works

References 

16th-century Italian architects
People from Novara
Italian military writers
Architects from Piedmont